Last Chance Creek is a major stream,  long, in Plumas County, California, United States and is part of the Feather River system. It flows generally northwest through uninhabited National Forest lands then turns southwest, then due west at the confluence with Squaw Queen Creek. From there it flows west to join with Red Clover Creek, its main tributary, before emptying into Indian Creek east of Genesee. Indian Creek is a tributary of the East Branch of the North Fork Feather River.

In terms of river mileage Last Chance Creek is the uppermost source of the Feather River. From the head of Last Chance Creek water flows  to the confluence of the Feather and Sacramento Rivers northwest of Sacramento.

See also
List of rivers of California

References

Rivers of Plumas County, California